Johnny Frankham (born 6 June 1948) is an English former professional boxer who was the British light-heavyweight champion in 1975. Frankham is a Romany Gypsy.

Frankham won the Amateur Boxing Association 1969 light heavyweight title, when boxing out of the Reading ABC.

In 2010, Frankham was jailed for two years at Guildford Crown Court for rogue trading.

Exhibition boxing record

References

1948 births
Living people
Light-heavyweight boxers
English Romani people
English male boxers
Romani sportspeople